The 2019–20 FC Arsenal Tula season was the club's fourth season back in the Russian Premier League, the highest tier of association football in Russia, since relegation at the end of the 2014–15 season, and their fifth in total.

Season events
On 17 March, the Russian Premier League postponed all league fixtures until April 10th due to the COVID-19 pandemic.

On 1 April, the Russian Football Union extended the suspension of football until 31 May.

On 15 May, the Russian Football Union announced that the Russian Premier League season would resume on 21 June.

On 17 June, FC Rostov announced that six of their players had tested positive for COVID-19.

On 1 July 2020, Igor Cherevchenko resigned as manager, with Sergei Podpaly being appointed as the clubs caretaker manager.

Squad

Out on loan

Transfers

In

Loans in

Out

Loans out

Released

Friendlies

Competitions

Premier League

Results by round

Results

League table

Russian Cup

UEFA Europa League

Qualifying rounds

Squad statistics

Appearances and goals

|-
|colspan="14"|Players away from the club on loan:

|-
|colspan="14"|Players who appeared for Arsenal Tula but left during the season:
|}

Goal scorers

Clean sheets

Disciplinary record

References

FC Arsenal Tula seasons
Arsenal Tula